Winter is the second studio album by South Korean brother-sister duo, AKMU.

Background
On December 22, 2016, YG Entertainment uploaded a poster that announces the release of AKMU's 20-minute long musical short film Spring of Winter, and announcing the release of the duo second full album Winter with the date set on January 3, 2017. On December 28, 2016, The full track list was revealed, with Lee Chan-hyuk producing and writing all the songs on the album.

Promotion and release
AKMU held Special Music Event: Winter Theater on December 28, 2016, a special event with the fans to listen to their new songs from the album before releasing it. On January 1, 2017, a short musical film was released.

Track listing

Release history

Notes

References

AKMU albums
2017 albums
YG Entertainment albums
Genie Music albums
Korean-language albums